Lough Money is a lake (lough in the Irish language) in County Down, about three miles from the town of Downpatrick, Northern Ireland. A rainbow trout fishery is maintained there for anglers.

References

Downpatrick
Money